Ellen Kuhl is the Walter B. Reinhold Professor in the School of Engineering and Robert Bosch Chair of Mechanical Engineering at Stanford University. She is a Professor of Mechanical Engineering and, by courtesy, Bioengineering. Kuhl is known for her research on Living Matter Physics, the design of theoretical and computational models to simulate and predict the behavior of living systems including the human brain and the living heart.

Bibliography
Kuhl grew up in Germany, and now lives in Palo Alto, California. She received her bachelor's and master's degrees in computational engineering from the Leibniz University of Hanover in 1993 and 1995, her Ph.D. in civil engineering from the University of Stuttgart in 2000, and her habilitation in mechanics from the Technical University of Kaiserslautern in 2004. She was appointed as assistant professor at the Technical University of Kaiserslautern in 2002, and joined the department of mechanical engineering at Stanford University in 2007. In 2011, she accepted a position at ETH Zurich, but returned to Stanford in 2012. She was promoted to full professor in 2016, and named the Walter B. Reinhold Professor in 2021. Since 2019, Kuhl has been the department chair of mechanical engineering.

Research
Kuhl's research integrates physics-based modeling with machine learning and creates interactive simulation tools to understand, explore, and predict the dynamics of living systems.
She has pioneered theories and algorithms for the growth of living systems,
and applies these theories to brain development, brain damage, neurodegeneration, Alzheimer’s disease, tissue expansion, heart failure, dilated and hypertrophic cardiomyopathy.
During the COVID-19 pandemic, her lab was among the first to use data-driven modeling to integrate classical epidemiology modeling and machine learning to infer critical disease parameters, in real time, from reported data to make informed predictions and guide political decision making. This work gained recognition during a legal challenge of the Newfoundland travel ban and in a study of superspreading events on college campuses.

Awards and honors
Kuhl is a Fellow of the American Society of Mechanical Engineers and of the American Institute for Medical and Biological Engineering. She received the National Science Foundation Career Award in 2010, was selected as Midwest Mechanics Seminar Speaker in 2014, and received the Humboldt Research Award in 2016 and the ASME Ted Belytschko Applied Mechanics Award in 2021.

Personal life
Kuhl is an All American triathlete. She ran the New York City Marathon in 2009, 2016, 2017, 2019, 2020, 2021, the Zurich Marathon in 2011, the San Francisco Marathon in 2013, the Chicago Marathon in 2017, and the Boston Marathon in 2018, 2019, 2020, 2021. She competed in three Ironmans and ten 70.3s, including the 2019 Ironman World Championship in Kona and the 2021 Ironman 70.3 World Championship in St. George, and she qualified for Kona in 2022.

Selected publications 
 Alber M, Buganza Tepole A, Cannon W, De S, Dura-Bernal S, Garikipati K, Karniadakis G, Lytton WW, Perdikaris P, Petzold L, Kuhl E. Integrating machine learning and multiscale modeling: Perspectives, challenges, and opportunities in the biological, biomedical, and behavioral sciences. npj Digital Medicine; 2019; 2:115. .
 Baillargeon B, Rebelo N, Fox DD, Taylor RL, Kuhl E. The Living Heart Project: A robust and integrative simulator for human heart function. Eur J Mech A/Solids. 2014;48:38-47. 
 Budday S, Nay R, de Rooij R, Steinmann P, Wyrobek T, Ovaert TC, Kuhl E. Mechanical properties of gray and white matter brain tissue by indentation. J Mech Behavior Biomed Mat. 2015;46:318-330. 
 Budday S, Sommer G, Hayback J, Steinmann P, Holzapfel GA, Kuhl E. Rheological characterization of human brain tissue. Acta Biomat. 2017; 60:315-329. 
 Goriely A, Geers MGD, Holzapfel GA, Jayamohan J, Jerusalem A, Sivaloganathan S, Squier W, van Dommelen JAW, Waters S, Kuhl E. Mechanics of the brain: Perspectives, challenges, and opportunities. Biomech Mod Mechanobio. 2015;14:931-965. 
 Kuhl E. Biophysics: Unfolding the brain. Nature Physics. 2016;12:533-534. 
 Kuhl E. Connectomics of neurodegeneration. Nat Neurosci. 2019; 22:1200–1202. 
 Kuhl E. Computational Epidemiology: Data-Driven Modeling of COVID-19, Springer Nature, 2021. .
 Linka K, Peirlinck M, Sahli Costabal F, Kuhl E. Outbreak dynamics of COVID-19 in Europe and the effect of travel restrictions. Comp Meth Biomech Biomed Eng; 2020; 23:710-717.  
 Linka K, Peirlinck M, Kuhl E. The reproduction number of COVID-19 and its correlation with public health interventions. Comp Mech. 2020; 66:1035-1050.  
 Peirlinck M, Linka K, Sahli Costabal F, Kuhl E. Outbreak dynamics of COVID-19 in China and the United States. Biomech Model Mechanobio; 2020; 19:2179-2193. 
 Peirlinck M, Sahli Costabal F, Yao J, Guccione JM, Tripathy S, Wang Y, Ozturk D, Segars P, Morrison TM, Levine S, Kuhl E. Precision medicine in human heart modeling. Perspectives, challenges and opportunities. Biomech Model Mechanobio. 2021; 20:803-831.  
 Sahli Costabal F, Yang Y, Perdikaris P, Hurtado DE, Kuhl E. Physics-informed neural networks for cardiac activation mapping. Front Phys. 2020; 8:42. 
 Schafer A, Peirlinck M, Linka K, Kuhl E. Bayesian physics-based modeling of tau propagation in Alzheimer's disease. Front Physiology. 2021; 12:702975.

References

External links
Living Matter Lab
Ellen Kuhl Google Scholar
Ellen Kuhl Facebook
Elen Kuhl Twitter

Year of birth missing (living people)
Living people
American mechanical engineers
American women engineers
German mechanical engineers
German women engineers
University of Hanover alumni
University of Stuttgart alumni
Academic staff of the Technical University of Kaiserslautern
Stanford University faculty
Academic staff of ETH Zurich
Fellows of the American Society of Mechanical Engineers
American women academics
21st-century American women